Meningen med livet was released on 24 March 2017, and is a studio album by Sonja Aldén.

Track listing

Charts

References

External links

2017 albums
Sonja Aldén albums
Swedish-language albums